is a Japanese football player who currently plays for Tochigi SC, on loan from Oita Trinita.

Career
Kenta Fukumori joined J2 League club Giravanz Kitakyushu in 2016.

Club statistics
Updated to 22 February 2018.

References

External links

Profile at Giravanz Kitakyushu

1994 births
Living people
National Institute of Fitness and Sports in Kanoya alumni
Association football people from Tokyo
Japanese footballers
J1 League players
J2 League players
J3 League players
Giravanz Kitakyushu players
Oita Trinita players
Tochigi SC players
Association football defenders